Helen Vickroy Austin (Vickroy; July 19, 1829 – August 1, 1921) was an American journalist and horticulturist.

Early life
Helen Vickroy was born in Miamisburg, Ohio, on July 19, 1829. She was a daughter of Edwin Augustus and Cornelia Harlan Vickroy. Her mother was a daughter of the Hon. George Harlen, of Warren County, Ohio. Her father was a son of Thomas Vickroy, of Pennsylvania, who was a soldier in the American Revolutionary War under George Washington, and an eminent surveyor and extensive landowner. When Austin was a child, the family removed to Pennsylvania and established a homestead in Ferndale.

Career
In 1850, she married William W. Austin, a native of Philadelphia, at that time residing at Richmond, Indiana, where they lived until 1885, when the family removed to Vineland, New Jersey. Of her three children, two sons died in childhood. 

Austin did considerable writing. Some of her best work was for the agricultural and horticultural press, and her essays at the horticultural meetings and interest in such matters gave her notability in horticultural circles. She was also a writer of sketches and essays and worked as a reporter and correspondent. Much of her work was of a fugitive nature for the local press. She also wrote in aid of philanthropic work. She was for many years identified with the cause of woman suffrage, and various woman's causes.

Long before the temperance crusade she was a pronounced advocate of temperance and while in her teens, was a Daughter of Temperance. She was a life member of the National Woman's Indian Rights Association, and was a member of the American Pomological Society.

Death
Helen Vickroy Austin died in 1921 and is buried in Earlham Cemetery, Richmond, Indiana.

References

Attribution

External links
 
 

1829 births
1921 deaths
19th-century American women writers
19th-century American journalists
American women journalists
People from Miamisburg, Ohio
American horticulturists
Women horticulturists and gardeners
American non-fiction outdoors writers
American suffragists
Wikipedia articles incorporating text from A Woman of the Century